The Canon EF 14mm 2.8L USM is an ultra wide angle prime lens. It is the widest prime lens in the Canon EF series. Because it is corrected for a rectilinear projection, the field of view is less than that of the Canon 15mm fisheye.

The front element of the lens is so prominent that it does not allow use of filters on the front. Filters are instead mounted on the rear.

On August 20, 2007, Canon announced the EF 14mm 2.8L II USM lens, which was released that October. This lens dramatically improved sharpness and chromatic aberration, and is especially good at close focusing distances. It has replaced the earlier lens.

Specifications

References

External links 

 EF14mm f/2.8L USM - Canon Camera Museum
 EF14mm f/2.8L II USM - Canon Camera Museum

Canon EF lenses
Camera lenses introduced in 2007